The Yamaha PSR-550 is a portable arranger workstation electronic keyboard produced in 2001.

Features
It features 713 sampled sounds, professional sounding DSP effects, 112 accompaniment styles, nine demo songs, a floppy disk storage drive, and a solid touch-responsive keyboard action. There's also a pitch bend wheel, and Bass-Boost stereo speakers. This keyboard was the first to utilize  the "Sweet" and "Cool" voices, which would later be seen in the Yamaha Motif series, and higher-end keyboards like the PSR-2100 and Tyros series. The "Sweet" voices are sampled instruments meant to capture the natural sounds of the instruments, while "Cool" voices reflect the sounds of electric instruments as they were heard through vintage amplifiers and effects. 

Controls placed to the left of the built-in LCD screen include DSP controls, touch-sensitivity, an alternate method of implementing sustain, and harmony and echo settings. The 550 was also the first keyboard to utilize a wide, easy to read, multi-color-changing display, which cycles between blue, red, and purple depending on operator activity. It was also the first keyboard to feature the Music Database system. The built-in floppy drive allows compositions to be saved, as well as the ability to download numerous new songs and keyboard configurations from the Internet. Additional controls include a toggle for auto-accompaniment, a tap-based tempo setting button, a transposition feature, and a rapid way to access the user's favorite presets. The Multi Pads allow drum sounds or short melodies to embellish user songs. The user can even record their own phrases for the Multi Pads.

See also
 List of Yamaha Synthesizers & Samplers

References

PSR-550

Polyphonic synthesizers
Digital synthesizers